Morikalang Beel (also spelled as Morikalong or Marikalong) is a U-shaped  lake located in Morigaon district of Assam.  This lake is surrounded by Raina Pathar Village and Buhagaon village.

Fisheries management 
This lake regulates the water regime and known for harvesting fish and other aquatic life.

See also
 List of lakes of Assam

References

Lakes of Assam
Morigaon district